Priscilla A. Wooten (March 31, 1936 – February 15, 2017) was an American politician who served in the New York City Council from 1983 to 2001.

In 1997, Wooten was the first African-American to endorse Mayor Rudy Giuliani's ultimately successful re-election campaign.

She died on February 15, 2017, in Brooklyn, New York City, New York at age 80.

References

1936 births
2017 deaths
New York City Council members
New York (state) Democrats
Women New York City Council members
African-American New York City Council members
African-American women in politics
People from Aiken, South Carolina
Politicians from Brooklyn
20th-century African-American people
21st-century African-American people
20th-century African-American women
21st-century African-American women